Abbasabad-e Rostamabad (also Romanized as ‘Abbāsābād-e Rostamābād; also known as ‘Abbāsābād) is a village in Khalazir Rural District, Aftab District, Tehran County, Tehran Province, Iran. At the 2006 census, its population was 73, in 13 families.

References 

Populated places in Tehran County